The Central Bank of Kuwait (CBK) is the central bank of Kuwait. It offers a strict currency system on behalf of the state. The bank regulates Kuwaiti stock market along with the Kuwait Stock Exchange, the Ministry of Commerce and Industry and the Ministry of Finance.

Overview
It was established on 30 June 1968. The bank launched Financial Intelligence Unit in 2003.

Salem Abdulaziz Al Sabah served as the governor of the bank until February 2012. Dr. Mohammad Al Hashel succeeded Sabah as governor in April 2012 and Yousef Al Obaid as deputy governor in May 2012.

Governors
Governors of the Central Bank of Kuwait.
Hamza A. Hussein (12 September 1973 – 11 September 1983)
Abdulwahab Al-Tammar (1 November 1983 – 30 September 1986)
Salem Abdulaziz Al Sabah (1 October 1986 – 11 February 2012; resigned)
Mohammad Al-Hashel (1 April 2012 – 31 March 2022)
Basel Ahmad Al-Haroon (1 April 2022 - present)

See also
 List of tallest buildings in Kuwait

References

External links
 

Banks established in 1969
Government agencies established in 1969
Banks of Kuwait
Buildings and structures in Kuwait City
Kuwait
Companies based in Kuwait City
Kuwaiti companies established in 1969